This is a glossary of historical Romanian ranks and titles used in the principalities of Moldavia, Wallachia and Transylvania, and later in Romania. Many of these titles are of Slavic etymology, with some of Greek, Latin, and Turkish etymology; several are original (such as armaș, paharnic, jitnicer and vistiernic). Various boier titles correspond to various honorary services at the Court, but often they were associated with various actual governmental duties as well.

Mare (Romanian), vel (Slavic) or baș (Turkish) are composing parts used with other titles. Synonymous with the Byzantine "Megas", they precede a title or rank: Mare Vornic, Mare Stolnic, Vel Paharnic, Vel Pitar, Vel Logofăt, Baș Boier, etc.

Middle Ages (1330/1359 — 1711/1716)

Phanariote era (1711/1716 — 1821)

See also
 Boyars of Wallachia and Moldavia
 Historical Romanian taxes

References

Titles
Ranks and titles
 
Romanian language
Government of the Principality of Wallachia